Crystal Canyon is a canyon on the northeastern edge of Juab County, Utah, United States.

Description
The canyon runs northwest‑southeast. An unnamed intermittent stream flows the length of the canyon.

Crystal Canyon was so named for worthless deposits of crystals which were initially believed to be diamonds.

See also

 List of canyons and gorges in Utah

References

Canyons and gorges of Utah
Landforms of Juab County, Utah